Garuda Dempo Station (formerly Polda Station) is a station of the Palembang Light Rail Transit Line 1 in South Sumatra, Indonesia. The station is located between  station and  station.

The station is the last station to be opened to the public after the supporting infrastructure is completed.

Station layout

References

Palembang
Railway stations in South Sumatra
Railway stations opened in 2018